Wolfgang Binding (born 1937 in Munich) is a German sculptor and graphic artist.

Biography 
Binding was born in Munich but grew up in Cologne. After graduating from high school in 1957, he completed an apprenticeship as a sculptor and stonemason at Cologne's Dombauhütte, and then studied sculpture at the Kunstakademie Düsseldorf. Between 1959 and 1963, he was a master student of Zoltan Székessy. In 1963, a scholarship enabled him to spend two years abroad in Alexandria and Cairo. He was assistant to Elmar Hillebrand between 1965 and 1975. After habilitating in sculpture in 1973, he became a visiting professor at Northern Michigan University, and then a full professor of sculpture at RWTH Aachen University. He retired in 1993.

Binding's most notable works comprise sculptures, fountains and monuments in several cities in Germany and Switzerland. His sculptures mostly depict animals or people in natural poses. For the World Equestrian Games 2006 in Aachen, he created the large sculpture Playing Horses. A large sculpture representing a goat was bought by the Solomon R. Guggenheim Museum in New York City.

In addition to his sculptures, Binding regularly exhibits his graphics and drawings.

Binding's daughter Stephanie also studied sculpture and graphic arts. The art historian Günther Binding is Wolfgang Binding's brother.

Selected works 
 Heiliger Georg (St. George), Aachen, 1980
 Ponyführerin (Horse-handler), Aachen Zoo, 1983
 Spiel- und Erlebnisbrunnen (Play and adventure fountain), Bergheim, 1984
 Eselreiterin (Donkey rider), Stolberg, 1986
 Entenfänger (Duck catcher), Aachen Zoo, 1986
 Kuhjunge schiebt Kuh (Boy pushes cow), Aachen-Eilendorf, 1988
 Spielende Pferde (Playing horses), Aachen, 2006

Gallery

References 

1937 births
German male sculptors
Artists from Munich
Kunstakademie Düsseldorf alumni
Living people